Joe Warren may refer to:
 Joe Warren (fighter) (born 1976), Greco-Roman wrestler and mixed martial artist
 Joe Warren (soccer) (born 1974), former American soccer player
 Joseph Warren (Mississippi politician) (born 1952), member of the Mississippi House of Representatives
 Joe Warren (Kansas politician) (1912-2003), Kansas state senator

See also
Joseph Warren (disambiguation)